A naval air squadron (NAS) is the title of naval aviation squadrons in some countries.

Poland
The Polish Morski Dywizjon Lotniczy #Naval Air Squadron# was formed in 1920 with two Escadrilles#

United Kingdom
The squadrons of the Fleet Air Arm are named as "nnnn Naval Air Squadron" where nnnn is a three or four digit number.

See also

 Naval aviation

References

Naval aviation